Elmer Stewart Rhodes III (born 1966) is a disbarred American lawyer and the founder of the Oath Keepers, an American far-right anti-government militia. In November 2022, he was convicted of seditious conspiracy and evidence tampering with regard to the January 6 United States Capitol attack.

Early life 
Elmer Stewart Rhodes III was born in Fresno, California in 1966. His father was a U.S. Marine and his mother worked on a farm. As an adult Rhodes wrote about his father abandoning his mother and him when he was three years old and that he grew up with his mother and her Mexican-American family. Rhodes has described himself as "mixed-race" and has "American-Indian" and Hispanic maternal ancestors.

Education and career 
Rhodes attended high school in Las Vegas, then joined the U.S. Army and was honorably discharged after seven months, the result of a spinal injury sustained during airborne school.

After attending community college, Rhodes switched to studying political science at the University of Nevada, Las Vegas, while parking cars to make money. In his first year he rejected well paid internships in favour of working at a conservative think tank. After graduating in 1998, he worked as a staffer for Republican Congressman Ron Paul.

In 2001, aged 36 years, Rhodes enrolled in Yale Law School, where he was noted as a defender of gun rights and for being well-intentioned with those with whom he had political differences. He became dissatisfied with what he perceived as eroding rights in the aftermath of the September 11 attacks. Rhodes taught a self-defense class, and his paper about enemy combatant's classification during the presidency of George W. Bush won an award in his final year at Yale. He graduated in 2004.

After graduating from Yale, Rhodes clerked for Michael D. Ryan, an associate justice at the Arizona Supreme Court. As a lawyer he worked in various western U.S. states. On December 8, 2015, Rhodes was disbarred by the Montana Supreme Court for conduct violating the Montana Rules of Professional Conduct after refusing to respond to two bar grievances filed against him in the federal district court of Arizona.

Oath Keepers 

Rhodes founded the Oath Keepers in March 2009. The organization was launched in Lexington, Massachusetts, at the location of the first American Revolutionary War battle. The launch occurred two months into the presidency of Barack Obama.

Under his leadership in 2013, the Oath Keepers instructed its members to form "Citizen Preservation" teams, which included militias, to operate in communities across the US meant to defend citizens against the government intentionally letting the country descend into chaos then declaring martial law and scrapping the constitution, stating that "They are preparing to control and contain us, and to shoot us, but not preparing to feed us."

Rhodes has collaborated with anti-government groups the Tenth Amendment Center and the Northwest Patriots. The Southern Poverty Law Center identifies him as an "extremist".

2020 United States presidential election 

For two months after the 2020 United States presidential election, Rhodes encouraged his supporters to reject Joe Biden as the incoming president. Rhodes spoke of a need to take up weapons to prevent Biden's inauguration and launched a campaign to persuade then president Donald Trump to invoke the Insurrection Act of 1807, deploy the military and the Oath Keepers as a militia.

Attack on United States Capitol 

On Nov. 7, 2020,  after the election had been called as a win for Biden,   Rhodes joined a Roger Stone text chat group asking "What’s the plan?";  Rhodes shared a proposal for storming Congress.   Rhodes encouraged followers to prepare for an "armed rebellion".

On December 12, 2020,   Rhodes spoke at a Pro-Trump rally in Washington, D.C., along with speakers including Michael Flynn, Sebastian Gorka, Alex Jones, podcaster David Harris Jr., Nick Fuentes, and Mike Lindell.    Rhodes called on Trump to invoke the Insurrection Act of 1807, and warned that not doing so would lead to a "much more bloody war." 

In the days prior to January 6, 2021, Rhodes and others traveled to Washington, D.C., where they armed themselves with firearms and tactical gear. Enroute to D.C.,  Rhodes personally spent $20,000 to purchase "a small arsenal".  On January 6, 2021, Rhodes entered "restricted Capitol grounds" where he directed Oath Keepers members via telephone and text, telling them which positions to take up around the building.  Four days after the attack, Rhodes attended a meeting where he was recorded saying "My only regret is that they should have brought rifles... We should have brought rifles. We could have fixed it right then and there. I'd hang fucking Pelosi from the lamppost."

On January 13, 2022, Rhodes and nine other members of the Oath Keepers were arrested and charged with seditious conspiracy. On November 29, 2022, after a nine-week trial, along with Kelly Meggs, Rhodes was convicted of seditious conspiracy and evidence tampering with regards to the January 6, 2021 United States Capitol attack. Their conviction was the first time the seditious conspiracy legislation had been used to prosecute anyone since 1995. His sentencing is expected in April 2023.

Personal life and views
Rhodes married Tasha Adams in 1994, after meeting her a few years earlier in Las Vegas. When they met Adams was 18 years old and working at an Arthur Murray Dance studio, and Rhodes was a 25 year old college student. Adams worked as an exotic dancer to financially support Rhodes' education during their marriage. Prior to their marriage, Rhodes accidentally shot himself in the face with a .22 hand gun after dropping it, destroying his eyeball and leaving him using a prosthetic eyeball.

Adams filed for divorce in 2018, accusing Rhodes of emotional and physical abuse. As of November 2022, the divorce application is pending. Adams and Rhodes have six children, including Dakota Adams, their eldest son, Sequoia Adams, and Sedona Adams. The family lived in New Haven and several states in the western United States.

Rhodes volunteered for Ron Paul's 2008 presidential campaign and later complained that political opponents of Paul linked Paul to hate groups and racists, despite the Ron Paul Report containing racist statements (according to the Southern Poverty Law Center). Rhodes is reported to have taken inspiration from the notion that Adolf Hitler could have been stopped if German soldiers and police had refused to follow orders. He has falsely stated that U.S. states can disregard federal laws.

See also
Criminal proceedings in the January 6 United States Capitol attack
List of University of Nevada, Las Vegas, alumni
List of Yale Law School alumni

References

External links

 
 

1966 births
Living people
Alt-right activists
Critics of Black Lives Matter
American conspiracy theorists
American nationalists
Convicted participants in the January 6 United States Capitol attack
Disbarred American lawyers
Members of the Oath Keepers
Organization founders
People convicted of sedition
People from Fresno, California
Sovereign citizen movement individuals
United States Army soldiers
University of Nevada, Las Vegas alumni
Yale Law School alumni